Talipahoga Rum Creek is a stream in the U.S. state of Georgia. It empties into Walter F. George Lake.

Talipahoga Rum is a name derived from the Muscogee language. Variant names are "Rum Creek" and "Talapagee Creek".

References

Rivers of Georgia (U.S. state)
Rivers of Stewart County, Georgia